The 2007 US Open men's doubles tennis tournament was held from 27 August to 9 September 2007, at USTA Billie Jean King National Tennis Center at Flushing Meadows, New York City.

Martin Damm and Leander Paes were the defending champions, but lost in the first round to Julien Benneteau and Nicolas Mahut. Simon Aspelin and Julian Knowle won the title, defeating Lukáš Dlouhý and  Pavel Vízner in the final, 7-5, 6-4.

Seeds

Draw

Finals

Top half

Section 1

Section 2

Bottom half

Section 3

Section 4

See also
List of tennis tournaments

References

External links
 Draw
2007 US Open – Men's draws and results at the International Tennis Federation

Men's Doubles
US Open (tennis) by year – Men's doubles